County Hall is a municipal facility at St George's Terrace, Carrick-on-Shannon in County Leitrim, Ireland.

History
The former gaol, which was originally a much larger affair, and the prison governor's house, a two-storey rendered building, were both completed in around 1810. Both buildings were acquired by Leitrim County Council in 1902. In 1968, a substantial part of the gaol was demolished leaving just the limestone guard building and the prison governor's house. The county council, which had previously been based in the Carrick-on-Shannon Courthouse, moved into the guardhouse, the prison governor's house and some newly built modern office facilities in 1994. The complex was refurbished and further extended in 2017.

References

Buildings and structures in County Leitrim
Carrick-on-Shannon